Hallsburg is a city in McLennan County, Texas, United States. The population was 507 at the 2010 census. It is part of the Waco Metropolitan Statistical Area.

Geography

Hallsburg is located at  (31.554978, –96.954512).

Demographics

As of the census of 2000, there were 518 people, 192 households, and 144 families residing in the city. The population density was 61.7 people per square mile (23.8/km2). There were 209 housing units at an average density of 24.9/sq mi (9.6/km2). The racial makeup of the city was 94.98% White, 2.12% African American, 0.77% Native American, 0.39% from other races, and 1.74% from two or more races. Hispanic or Latino of any race were 4.44% of the population.

There were 192 households, out of which 39.1% had children under the age of 18 living with them, 64.1% were married couples living together, 7.8% had a female householder with no husband present, and 24.5% were non-families. 22.9% of all households were made up of individuals, and 10.4% had someone living alone who was 65 years of age or older. The average household size was 2.70 and the average family size was 3.16.

In the city, the population was spread out, with 29.3% under the age of 18, 6.2% from 18 to 24, 29.2% from 25 to 44, 22.6% from 45 to 64, and 12.7% who were 65 years of age or older. The median age was 38 years. For every 100 females, there were 98.5 males. For every 100 females age 18 and over, there were 98.9 males.

The median income for a household in the city was $39,375, and the median income for a family was $52,708. Males had a median income of $31,538 versus $29,000 for females. The per capita income for the city was $17,355. About 7.7% of families and 5.6% of the population were below the poverty line, including 6.2% of those under age 18 and 7.5% of those age 65 or over.

Education
The City of Hallsburg is served by the Hallsburg Independent School District.

References

Cities in McLennan County, Texas
Cities in Texas